Breage, Germoe and Sithney was an electoral division of Cornwall in the United Kingdom which returned one member to sit on Cornwall Council between 2013 and 2021. It was abolished at the 2021 local elections, being succeeded by Porthleven, Breage and Germoe and Crowan, Sithney and Wendron.

Councillors

Extent
Breage, Germoe and Sithney represented the villages of Praa Sands, Germoe, Breage, Sithney, Prospidnick, Carleen, Godolphin Cross, Boscreege and Ashton as well as the hamlets of Newtown, Hendra, Rinsey, Rinsey Croft, Sithney Green, Crowntown, Trew, Polladras, Balwest, Great Work, Trescowe and Tresowes Green. Parts of Nancegollan, Coverack Bridges and Lowertown are also included and are shared with Crowan and Wendron division. The division covered 4,925 hectares in total.

Election results

2017 election

2013 election

References

Electoral divisions of Cornwall Council